Gary Hetherington (born 1954) is an English professional rugby league executive and former professional rugby league footballer and coach. He is the chief executive officer of the Leeds Rhinos in the Super League.

Hetherington made his début for Wakefield Trinity in January 1973. He played for Wakefield Trinity, York, Leeds, Hunslet (loan), Kent Invicta, Huddersfield, Sheffield Eagles and Whitehaven (two spells).

Hetherington founded Sheffield Eagles in 1982. He served as the club's general manager and coach as well as a player.

He joined Leeds in 1996, and rebranded the club in 1997, adding the Rhinos nickname. In his time at Leeds, the club has won eight Super League Grand Finals, three Challenge Cups and three World Club Challenges.

In 1997, he and Paul Caddick bought Leeds Rhinos rugby league team, and they co-founded Leeds Rugby Limited.

He was President of the Rugby Football League in 2004. His wife Kath was President of the Rugby Football League in 1995.

See also

List of Super League rugby league club owners
List of owners of English football clubs
List of professional sports team owners

References

External links
Leeds Rhinos profile
Leeds Rhinos: Pressure’s on us admits Hetherington
Gary Hetherington looks back at 20 years of Super League
Broncos man to coach Eagles
Rugby League: Gardner takes leave of Sheffield

1954 births
Living people
British rugby league administrators
English chief executives
English rugby league coaches
English rugby league players
Huddersfield Giants players
Kent Invicta players
Leeds Rhinos players
Leeds Rhinos
Rugby league players from Castleford
Rugby league chairmen and investors
Rugby league hookers
Rugby league second-rows
Sheffield Eagles (1984) coaches
Sheffield Eagles (1984) players
Wakefield Trinity players
Whitehaven R.L.F.C. players